Linda Coffin is a former England women's international footballer. Coffin's greatest achievement was winning the 1975 Women's FA cup with Southampton Women's F.C.

Honours
Southampton
 FA Women's Cup: 1974–75, 1975–76

References

Living people
Women's association football defenders
Southampton Women's F.C. players
English women's footballers
England women's international footballers
Year of birth missing (living people)